Adolf "Ulf" Konstantin Jakob Freiherr Pilar von Pilchau (23 May 1851 – 17 June 1925) was a Baltic German politician, regent of the United Baltic Duchy (1918).

Pilar von Pilchau became the owner of the Audern manor, his birthplace after his father's death in 1870. In 1881 he rented Sauck manor. Both are situated in modern Pärnu County, Estonia.

He started his political and administrative career in 1876 as a judge in the first district of Pernau (Pärnu) and proceeded from there to the position of Pernau city councillor in 1879. Three years later he began working for the Livonian Noble Corporation, the local government. He filled in the position of the treasurer. In 1899 he was elected the land councillor of Livonia which was a high position in the local government of Baltic Germans.

From 1912 to 1917 he was also a member of the State Council of Imperial Russia as a representative of Livonia.

He was one of the persons behind the creation of the short-lived United Baltic Duchy and the only Chairman of its Regency Council from 5 November 1918 to 28 November 1918.

On 3 January 1919, Pilar von Pilchau went into exile and lived for several years in Weimar Germany. He returned to independent Estonia in 1923 with his wife and settled in Pärnu where he died two years later.

References

1851 births
1925 deaths
People from Pärnu
People from the Governorate of Livonia
Baltic-German people
Barons of Germany
Regents of Germany
German politicians
Rulers of Estonia
Estonian independence activists